Negative liberty is freedom from interference by other people. Negative liberty is primarily concerned with freedom from external restraint and contrasts with positive liberty (the possession of the power and resources to fulfill one's own potential). The distinction was introduced by Isaiah Berlin in his 1958 lecture "Two Concepts of Liberty".

Overview 
Stanford Encyclopedia of Philosophy describes negative liberty:
"The negative concept of freedom ... is most commonly assumed in liberal defences of the constitutional liberties typical of liberal-democratic societies, such as freedom of movement, freedom of religion, and freedom of speech, and in arguments against paternalist or moralist state intervention. It is also often invoked in defences of the right to private property, although some have contested the claim that private property necessarily enhances negative liberty."Cf. Cohen, G. A., 1991, Capitalism, Freedom and the Proletariat.

History 
According to Thomas Hobbes, "a free man is he that in those things which by his strength and wit he is able to do is not hindered to do what he hath the will to do" (Leviathan, Part 2, Ch. XXI; thus alluding to liberty in its negative sense).

Claude Adrien Helvétius expressed the following point clearly: "The free man is the man who is not in irons, nor imprisoned in a gaol, nor terrorized like a slave by the fear of punishment ... it is not lack of freedom, not to fly like an eagle or swim like a whale." Moreover, John Jay, in The Federalist paper No. 2, stated that: "Nothing is more certain than the indispensable necessity of Government, and it is equally undeniable, that whenever and however it is instituted, the people must cede to it some of their natural rights, in order to vest it with requisite powers." Jay's meaning would be better expressed by substituting "negative liberty" in place of "natural rights", for the argument here is that the power or authority of a legitimate government derives in part from our accepting restrictions on negative liberty.

An idea that anticipates the distinction between negative and positive liberty was G. F. W. Hegel's "sphere of abstract right" (furthered in his Elements of the Philosophy of Right), which constitutes what now is called negative freedom and his subsequent distinction between "abstract" and "positive liberty."

In the Anglophone analytic tradition, the distinction between negative and positive liberty was introduced by Isaiah Berlin in his 1958 lecture "Two Concepts of Liberty". According to Berlin, the distinction is deeply embedded in the political tradition. In Berlin's words, "liberty in the negative sense involves an answer to the question: 'What is the area within which the subject—a person or group of persons—is or should be left to do or be what he is able to do or be, without interference by other persons'." Restrictions on negative liberty are imposed by a person, not by natural causes or incapacity.

Frankfurt School psychoanalyst and humanistic philosopher Erich Fromm drew a similar distinction between negative and positive freedom in his 1941 work, The Fear of Freedom, that predates Berlin's essay by more than a decade.  Fromm sees the distinction between the two types of freedom emerging alongside humanity's evolution away from the instinctual activity that characterizes lower animal forms.  This aspect of freedom, he argues, "is here used not in its positive sense of 'freedom to' but in its negative sense of 'freedom from', namely freedom from instinctual determination of his actions."  For Fromm, then, negative freedom marks the beginning of humanity as a species conscious of its own existence free from base instinct.

The distinction between positive and negative liberty is considered specious by some socialist and Marxist political philosophers, who argue that positive and negative liberty are indistinguishable in practice, or that one cannot exist without the other.  Although he is not a socialist nor a Marxist, Berlin argues:
It follows that a frontier must be drawn between the area of private life and that of public authority. Where it is to be drawn is a matter of argument, indeed of haggling. Men are largely interdependent, and no man's activity is so completely private as never to obstruct the lives of others in any way. 'Freedom for the pike is death for the minnows'; the liberty of some must depend on the restraint of others.

Anarcho-capitalist thinker Tibor Machan defends negative liberty as "required for moral choice and, thus, for human flourishing," claiming that it "is secured when the rights of individual members of a human community to life, to voluntary action (or to liberty of conduct), and to property are universally respected, observed, and defended."

According to Charles Taylor, freedom means being able to do what you want, without any external obstacles. This concept has been criticized for being too simplistic and not taking into account the importance of individual self-realization. Therefore, Taylor suggests that negative liberty is little more than a philosophical term and that real liberty is achieved when significant social and economic inequalities are also considered. He proposed dialectical positive liberty as a means to gaining both negative and positive liberty, by overcoming the inequalities that divide us. According to Taylor, positive liberty is the ability to fulfill one's purposes, while negative liberty is the freedom from interference by others.

Negative liberty and authority: Hobbes and Locke 

One might ask, "How is persons's desire for liberty to be reconciled with the assumed need for authority?" Its answer by various thinkers provides a fault line for understanding their view on liberty but also a cluster of intersecting concepts such as authority, equality, and justice.

Hobbes and Locke give two influential and representative solutions to this question. As a starting point, both agree that a line must be drawn and a space sharply delineated where each individual can act unhindered according to their tastes, desires, and inclinations. This zone defines the sacrosanct space of personal liberty. But, they believe no society is possible without some authority, where the intended purpose of authority is to prevent collisions among the different ends and, thereby, to demarcate the boundaries where each person's zone of liberty begins and ends. Where Hobbes and Locke differ is the extent of the zone. Hobbes, who took a rather negative view of human nature, argued that a strong authority was needed to curb men's intrinsically wild, savage, and corrupt impulses. Only a powerful authority can keep at bay the permanent and always looming threat of anarchy. Locke believed, on the other hand, that men on the whole are more good than wicked and, accordingly, the area for individual liberty can be left rather at large.

Locke is a slightly more ambiguous case than Hobbes because although his conception of liberty was largely negative (in terms of non-interference), he differed in that he courted the republican tradition of liberty by rejecting the notion that an individual could be free if he was under the arbitrary power of another:

"This freedom from absolute, arbitrary power, is so necessary to, and closely joined with a man's preservation, that he cannot part with it, but by what forfeits his preservation and life together: for a man, not having the power of his own life, cannot, by compact, or his own consent, enslave himself to any one, nor put himself under the absolute, arbitrary power of another, to take away his life, when he pleases. No body can give more power than he has himself; and he that cannot take away his own life, cannot give another power over it. Indeed, having by his fault forfeited his own life, by some act that deserves death; he, to whom he has forfeited it, may (when he has him in his power) delay to take it, and make use of him to his own service, and he does him no injury by it: for, whenever he finds the hardship of his slavery outweigh the value of his life, it is in his power, by resisting the will of his master, to draw on himself the death he desires."

Concrete example 

This section outlines specific examples of governmental types which follow the concept of negative liberty.

Monarchy
Thomas Hobbes' Leviathan outlines a commonwealth based upon a monarchy to whom citizens have ceded their rights. The basic reasoning for Hobbes' assertion that this system was most ideal relates more to Hobbes' value of order and simplicity in government. The monarchy provides for its subjects, and its subjects go about their day-to-day lives without interaction with the government:
The commonwealth is instituted when all agree in the following manner: I authorise and give up my right of governing myself to this man, or to this assembly of men, on this condition; that thou give up, thy right to him, and authorise all his actions in like manner.

The sovereign has twelve principal rights:
 because a successive covenant cannot override a prior one, the subjects cannot (lawfully) change the form of government.
 because the covenant forming the commonwealth is the subjects giving to the sovereign the right to act for them, the sovereign cannot possibly breach the covenant; and therefore the subjects can never argue to be freed from the covenant because of the actions of the sovereign.
 the selection of sovereign is (in theory) by majority vote; the minority have agreed to abide by this.
 every subject is author of the acts of the sovereign: hence the sovereign cannot injure any of his subjects, and cannot be accused of injustice.
 following this, the sovereign cannot justly be put to death by the subjects.
 because the purpose of the commonwealth is peace, and the sovereign has the right to do whatever he thinks necessary for the preserving of peace and security and prevention of discord, therefore the sovereign may judge what opinions and doctrines are averse; who shall be allowed to speak to multitudes; and who shall examine the doctrines of all books before they are published.
 to prescribe the rules of civil law and property.
 to be judge in all cases.
 to make war and peace as he sees fit; and to command the army.
 to choose counsellors, ministers, magistrates and officers.
 to reward with riches and honour; or to punish with corporal or pecuniary punishment or ignominy.
 to establish laws of honour and a scale of worth.

Hobbes explicitly rejects the idea of Separation of Powers, in particular the form that would later become the separation of powers under the United States Constitution. Part 6 is a perhaps under-emphasised feature of Hobbes's argument: his is explicitly in favour of censorship of the press and restrictions on the rights of free speech, should they be considered desirable by the sovereign in order to promote order.

Upon closer inspection of Hobbes' Leviathan, it becomes clear that Hobbes believed individual people in society must give up liberty to a sovereign. Whether that sovereign is an absolute monarch or other form was left open to debate, however Hobbes himself viewed the absolute monarch as the best of all options. Hobbes himself said,
For as amongst masterless men, there is perpetual war, of every man against his neighbour; no inheritance, to transmit to the son, nor to expect from the father; no propriety of goods, or lands; no security; but a full and absolute liberty in every particular man: so in states, and commonwealths not dependent on one another, every commonwealth, not every man, has an absolute liberty, to do what it shall judge, that is to say, what that man, or assembly that representeth it, shall judge most conducing to their benefit.
From this quote it is clear that Hobbes contended that people in a state of nature ceded their individual rights to create sovereignty, retained by the state, in return for their protection and a more functional society. In essence, a social contract between the sovereign and citizens evolves out of pragmatic self-interest. Hobbes named the state Leviathan, thus pointing to the artifice involved in the social contract. In this vein, Hobbes' concept of negative liberty was built upon the notion that the state would not act upon its subjects because its subjects had willingly relinquished their liberties.

See also 
 Mutual liberty
 Non-aggression principle
 Real freedom
 Self-ownership

Notes and references

Further reading
 Isaiah Berlin, Freedom and its Betrayal, Princeton University Press, . 2003.

External links 
 Positive and Negative Liberty from the Stanford Encyclopedia of Philosophy

Classical liberalism
Libertarian theory
Social concepts
Human rights concepts